is a passenger railway station  located in the town of Daisen, Tottori Prefecture, Japan. It is operated by the West Japan Railway Company (JR West).

Lines

Station layout
The station consists of two opposed ground-level side platform connected by a footbridge. The station is unattended.

Platforms

Adjacent stations
West Japan Railway Company (JR West)

History
Daisenguchi Station opened on September 17, 1926. On July 28, 1945,  about 600 meters east of Daisenguchi Station, a train with two carriages prominently marked with red cross markings transporting wounded and sick soldiers with attendant nurses and medics, and nine passenger carriages with 1200 civilians was strafed and rocketed by three United States Navy F6F Hellcats, resulting in 44 deaths and 33 severe injuries. This incident is marked by a commemorative monument at the station. With the privatization of the Japan National Railways (JNR) on April 1, 1987, the station came under the aegis of the West Japan Railway Company.

Passenger statistics
In fiscal 2018, the station was used by an average of 426 passengers daily.

See also
List of railway stations in Japan

References

External links 

 Daisenguchi Station from JR-Odekake.net 

Railway stations in Tottori Prefecture
Stations of West Japan Railway Company
Sanin Main Line
Railway stations in Japan opened in 1926
Daisen, Tottori